Dhanurasana is a back bending asana in hatha yoga and modern yoga as exercise.

Etymology and origins

The name comes from the Sanskrit words धनुर (dhanura) meaning "bow", and आसन (āsana) meaning "posture" or "seat".

A similar pose named Nyubjasana, "the face-down asana", is described and illustrated in the 19th century Sritattvanidhi. The pose is illustrated in half-tone in the 1905 Yogasopana Purvacatuska and named Dhanurāsana, quoting the Gheranda Samhita'''s description.

It is unclear whether the asana is medieval, as although the name is used, the intended pose might be the sitting Akarna Dhanurasana rather than this backbend. The account of Dhanurasana in the 15th century Hatha Yoga Pradipika is ambiguous about whether the pose is reclining or sitting, stating

The 17th century Gheranda Samhita'' is similarly ambiguous, stating

Dhanurasana is used in the classical Indian dance form Bharatanatyam.

Description

From a prone position, the feet are grasped to lift the legs and chest to form the shape of a bow with the body, with the arms representing the bowstring. Balasana can be used as a counter pose.

Variations

Variations include:

 Parsva Dhanurasana, the same pose with the body rolled onto one side.
 Purna Dhanurasana, a more extreme backbend with the legs brought to the head

Counter asanas are Halasana and Sarvangasana.

See also 

 Akarna Dhanurasana, a sitting pose resembling an archer shooting an arrow
 Salabhasana, an easier reclining backbend
 Urdhva Dhanurasana, the upwards bow or wheel

References

Sources

Reclining asanas
Medieval Hatha Yoga asanas